Surga Yang Tak Dirindukan is an Indonesian drama film which produced by Manoj Punjabi and released on July 15, 2015. The film starred by Fedi Nuril, Laudya Cynthia Bella, Raline Shah, Kemal Pahlevi, Tanta Ginting, Landung Simatupang, and Zaskia Adya Mecca. The film based on the best-selling novel by Asma Nadia.

The film receiving many nominations in other ceremonies awards: "Best Film" at the 2015 Indonesian Film Festival, "Favorite Film" at the 2016 Indonesian Movie Actor Awards, "Movie of the Year"  at the 2016 Indonesian Choice Awards, "Best Film Poster", "Best Film Trailer", and "Best Behind the Scene" at the 2016 Indonesian Box Office Movie Awards. And also the film only three receiving awards in the other awards: "Most Celeb Indonesian Film" award at the 2015 Selebrita Awards, "Best Film" award and "Grossing Film" award at the 2016 Indonesian Box Office Movie Awards.

Cast
 Fedi Nuril as Andhika Prasetya
 Laudya Cynthia Bella as Citra Arini
 Raline Shah as Mei Rose
 Kemal Pahlevi as Amran
 Tanta Ginting as Hartono
 Zaskia Adya Mecca as Sita
 Landung Simatupang as Sutejo
 Ray Sitoresmi as Sulasti
 Sandrinna Michelle as Nadia
 Vitta Mariana as Lia

Awards and nominations

References

External links
 
 Surga Yang Tak Dirindukan twitter
 Surga Yang Tak Dirndukan facebook

Indonesian drama films